Paddington Parish, is a rural locality of Cobar Shire and a civil Parish of Booroondarra County.

The parish is located at 32°09′00″S 145°06′36″E midway between Ivanhoe, New South Wales  and Cubba, New South Wales and main landmarks include Paddington Nature Reserve and Keewah Lake.

See also
 Paddington, New South Wales

References

Localities in New South Wales
Geography of New South Wales